The Edixa Reflex cameras, introduced in 1954 were West Germany's most popular own series of SLR's with focal plane shutter. The original name of the first Edixa SLR was Komet. The Wirgin company had to change the name after complaints of two other companies with equally named products. Since 1955 the cameras got additional slow shutter speeds, and since 1956 cameras with aperture release shifter for the M42 lenses were available. Until 1959 four lines of Edixa SLRs were introduced:

Type A, with shutter speeds up to 1/1000 sec.
Type B, with aperture release mechanics
Type C, with meter
Type D, with exposure times up to 9 sec.

In 1960 the types B, C and D got the rapid mirror and improved shutter mechanics. Type A was replaced by the type S which had a slower shutter. A special feature of this camera series was the exchangeable viewfinder unit. A simple top-viewfinder and a pentaprism finder were available.  In 1960 the Model B had a name change and became the Edixa-Mat Flex Model B, the word Reflex being shortened to Flex, and it featured shutter speeds from 1/25 to 1/1000 of a second, the instant return mirror, automatic aperture actuation and interchangeable viewfinders. The waist-level finder was standard and the pentaprism was an optional extra.  The retail price in the UK in 1960 was about £48.

External links

Edixa Reflex by Sylvain Halgand (French)
Edixa Reflex A at Schaum-Holzappel's (German source)
Wirgin Edixa SLRs at ukcamera.com

SLR cameras
Wirgin cameras